Phrudocentra centrifugaria is a species of emerald moth in the family Geometridae. It is found in the Caribbean Sea and North America.

The MONA or Hodges number for Phrudocentra centrifugaria is 7051.

Subspecies
These five subspecies belong to the species Phrudocentra centrifugaria:
 Phrudocentra centrifugaria centrifugaria
 Phrudocentra centrifugaria heterospila Hampson, 1904
 Phrudocentra centrifugaria impunctata Warren, 1909
 Phrudocentra centrifugaria punctata Warren, 1904
 Phrudocentra centrifugaria stellataria Möschler, 1886

References

Further reading

External links

 

Geometrinae
Articles created by Qbugbot
Moths described in 1870